André Strappe (23 February 1928 – 10 February 2006) was a French professional footballer who played as a forward, and later served as a manager.

Club career 
Strappe was a player for Lille, Le Havre, and Nantes, and then a player-manager for Bastia, Tavaux-Damparis, and Châteauroux. He scored 112 goals in the French Division 1 and won the league tournament in 1953–54 with Lille. He also won the Coupe de France in 1953 and 1955 with Lille, and again with Le Havre in 1959.

International career 
He also played 23 matches and scored 4 goals for France. He participated at the 1948 Summer Olympics, and in the 1954 FIFA World Cup in Switzerland.

Honours 
Lille
 French Division 1: 1953–54
 Coupe de France: , ; runner-up: 
 Coupe Charles Drago runner-up: , 

Le Havre
 French Division 2: 1958–59
 Coupe de France: 1958–59
 Challenge des Champions:

References

External links
 

 
 
Profile on French federation official site

1928 births
2006 deaths
People from Bully-les-Mines
Sportspeople from Pas-de-Calais
French footballers
France international footballers
Association football forwards
Lille OSC players
Le Havre AC players
FC Nantes players
SC Bastia players
LB Châteauroux players
Ligue 1 players
Ligue 2 players
Championnat National players
Olympic footballers of France
Footballers at the 1948 Summer Olympics
1954 FIFA World Cup players
French football managers
Player-coaches
SC Bastia managers
LB Châteauroux managers
Ligue 2 managers
Footballers from Hauts-de-France